Reyada International School (formerly known as Scientific Reyada School) is a coeducational school in Amman, Jordan. Founded in 1999, the school began with 20 children in kindergarten and gradually grew to include classes up to the 12th grade.

The school opens its doors to pupils willing to study for either the Jordanian certificate of Secondary Education (Tawjihi) or for IGCSE O-level and GCE A-level British program. It is  approved by the British Council for teaching the Cambridge International Examinations and Edexcel International curriculum.

References

High schools and secondary schools in Jordan
Cambridge schools in Jordan
International schools in Jordan
Schools in Amman
Educational institutions established in 1999
1999 establishments in Jordan
Jordan